The Roman Catholic Diocese of Aguleri is a diocese of the Roman Catholic Church in Nigeria.

History
12 February 2023: the diocese was established from the archdiocesan territories of Onitsha to which it was made a suffragan diocese.

Ordinaries
Bishops of Aguleri
Denis Chidi Isizoh (12 February 2023 - Present)

See also
Roman Catholicism in Nigeria

References

Roman Catholic dioceses in Nigeria
Christian organizations established in 2023
Roman Catholic dioceses and prelatures established in the 21st century
Roman Catholic Ecclesiastical Province of Onitsha